Welcome is a 2009 French film directed by Philippe Lioret. It stars Vincent Lindon and features Firat Ayverdi and Derya Ayverdi in their inaugural roles. The film was released on 11 March 2009 in France. The director wanted to highlight the plight of immigrants living in Calais, France, and their plans to reach the United Kingdom.

Plot
The film tells the story of Simon Calmat (Vincent Lindon), a French swimming coach who is divorcing his wife Marion (Audrey Dana). Simon tries to help a young Iraqi-Kurd immigrant, Bilal Kayani (Firat Ayverdi), whose dream is to cross the English Channel from Calais in France to the United Kingdom by any means possible to be reunited with his girlfriend Mina (Derya Ayverdi). Meanwhile, Mina's father strongly opposes Bilal's plans as he wants to marry his daughter to her cousin who owns a restaurant. After being caught with other immigrants and returned to France, Simon gives him temporary refuge at his home after the young Bilal, nicknamed "Bazda" (runner, for his athletic abilities and love of football and Manchester United in particular) registers for swimming lessons, intending to train to be able to swim across the Channel. After police search Simon's apartment, Bilal goes on a final attempt and drowns 800 meters from the English coast while hiding from the coastguard. Simon then travels to inform Mina.

Cast
 Vincent Lindon as Simon Calmat
 Firat Ayverdi as Bilal Kayani, "Bazda", 17-year-old Iraqi-Kurd immigrant
 Audrey Dana as Marion, Simon's wife
 Olivier Rabourdin as Police lieutenant 
 Derya Ayverdi as Mîna, girlfriend of Bilal
 Yannick Renier as Simon's colleague at the swimming pool
 Thierry Godard as Bruno, immigration activist and friend of Marion at the volunteers
 Fırat Çelik as Koban, a furious Turkish immigrant pursuing Bilal for a debt
 Jean-Paul Comart as The rank
 Mouafaq Rushdie as Mîna's father
 Behi Djanati Atai as Mîna's mother
 Patrick Ligardes as Hostile neighbor
 Jean-Paul Brissart as Immigration judge
 Éric Hérson-Macarel as Police officer at the detention center
 Emmanuel Courcol as Manager at the supermarket 
 Jean-François Fagour as Security personnel at the supermarket
 Jean-Christophe Voiron as Czech truck driver

Reception
The film became popular with audiences in France alone reaching 780,000 in just 3 weeks on screen. The debate about immigration intensified after French Immigration Minister Éric Besson and film director Philippe Lioret debated the issue during the popular French television discussion show Ce soir (ou jamais !). Lioret took the opportunity to ask for an amendment to French law depenalising those who help refugees. "If such a thing passes on [amending] this article, it will be a victory", he declared.

The French member of parliament Daniel Goldberg introduced a proposition to decriminalize the aiding of unauthorised immigration (l'immigration clandestine). The proposition was hotly debated. The amendment was discussed but did not become law. Goldberg said he intended to introduce further measures to amend the law. Another proposition was tabled by a group of Communist senators, but never discussed.

Accolades
On 25 November 2009, the film won the Lux Prize from the European Parliament.

Other awards:
 2009: Won "Label Europa Cinemas" and "Prize of the Ecumenical Jury" at the Berlin International Film Festival
 2009: Won "Best Screenplay" and "Special Prize of the Young Jury" at the Gijon International Film Festival
 2009: Won Grand Prize for Dramatic Feature at the Heartland Film Festival
 2009: Won the Audience Award at the Warsaw International Film Festival
 2010: Won Lumières Award for Best Film at the 15th Lumières Awards
 2010: Won Prix Jacques Prévert du Scénario for Best Original Screenplay

See also 
 Kurdish Cinema

References

External links
 

2009 films
2000s French-language films
2009 drama films
French drama films
Films directed by Philippe Lioret
Films about immigration
Best Film Lumières Award winners
Films scored by Wojciech Kilar
Kurdish culture in France
Films scored by Nicola Piovani
2000s French films